Kulmbach is an electoral constituency (German: Wahlkreis) represented in the Bundestag. It elects one member via first-past-the-post voting. Under the current constituency numbering system, it is designated as constituency 240. It is located in northern Bavaria, comprising the Kulmbach district, the Lichtenfels district, and the northern part of the Bamberg district.

Kulmbach was created for the inaugural 1949 federal election. Since 2013, it has been represented by Emmi Zeulner of the Christian Social Union (CSU).

Geography
Kulmbach is located in northern Bavaria. As of the 2021 federal election, it comprises the districts of Kulmbach and Lichtenfels as well as the municipalities of Bischberg, Breitengüßbach, Gundelsheim, Heiligenstadt in Oberfranken, Kemmern, Litzendorf, Memmelsdorf, Oberhaid, Rattelsdorf, Scheßlitz, Viereth-Trunstadt, and Zapfendorf and the Verwaltungsgemeinschaften of Baunach and Steinfeld from the Bamberg district.

History
Kulmbach was created in 1949. In the 1949 election, it was Bavaria constituency 29 in the numbering system. In the 1953 through 1961 elections, it was number 224. In the 1965 through 1998 elections, it was number 226. In the 2002 and 2005 elections, it was number 241. Since the 2009 election, it has been number 240.

Originally, the constituency comprised the independent city of Kulmbach and the districts of Landkreis Kulmbach, Lichtenfels, Naila, and Stadtsteinach. In the 1965 through 1972 elections, it comprised the independent cities of Kulmbach and Forchheim and the districts of Landkreis Kulmbach, Landkreis Forchheim, Lichtenfels, Stadtsteinach, and Ebermannstadt. In the 1976 through 1998 elections, it comprised the districts of Kulmbach and Lichtenfels as well as the municipalities of Baunach, Scheßlitz, Gerach, Heiligenstadt, Königsfeld, Lauter, Rattelsdorf, Reckendorf, Stadelhofen, Wattendorf, and Zapfendorf from the Bamberg district. It acquired its current borders in the 2002 election.

Members
The constituency has been held by the Christian Social Union (CSU) during all but one Bundestag term since its creation. It was first represented by Friedrich Schönauer of the Social Democratic Party (SPD) from 1949 until his death in 1950. Johannes Semler of the CSU won the resulting by-election. He was succeeded by Max Spörl in the 1953 federal election, followed by Gustav Sühler in 1957, and Karl Theodor zu Guttenberg in 1961. Lorenz Niegel was then representative from 1969 to 1990. Bernd Protzner served from 1990 to 2002, followed by Karl-Theodor zu Guttenberg from 2002 to 2013. Emmi Zeulner was elected in 2013, and re-elected in 2017 and 2021.

Election results

2021 election

2017 election

2013 election

2009 election

References

Federal electoral districts in Bavaria
1949 establishments in West Germany
Constituencies established in 1949
Kulmbach (district)
Lichtenfels (district)
Bamberg (district)